Bucko Lake Mine is a nickel mine near Wabowden, Manitoba, Canada and is owned by CaNickel Mining LTD previously Crowflight Minerals who purchased the property from Xtrata.  Production began on 10 June 2009.

Footnotes

Nickel mines in Canada
Mines in Manitoba
Underground mines in Canada